Expert Pool is a video game developed by Visual Sciences and Psygnosis and published by Psygnosis and GT Interactive for Windows in 1999.

Reception

The game received average reviews according to the review aggregation website GameRankings.

References

External links
 

1999 video games
Cue sports video games
GT Interactive games
Psygnosis games
Windows games
Windows-only games
Video games developed in the United Kingdom